The Men's compound 50m event at the 2010 South American Games was held on March 23 at 9:00.

Medalists

Results

References
Report

50m Compound Men